It's Too Late may refer to:

Albums
 It's Too Late, an album by Wilson Pickett 1967
 It's Too Late, an album by Ferrante & Teicher
 It's Too Late, an album by Bobby Goldsboro

Songs
 "It's Too Late" (Chuck Willis song), 1956
 "It's Too Late" (Bobby Goldsboro song), 1966
 "It's Too Late" (Carole King song), 1971
 "It's Too Late" (Evermore song)
 "It's Too Late" (Lucie Silvas song)
 "It's Too Late to Love Me Now", a song also known as "It's Too Late", most notably recorded by Jeanne Pruett
 "It's Too Late", a song by Jim Carroll from Catholic Boy
"It's Too Late", a song by Small Faces from Small Faces
 "It's Too Late", a 1963 chart single and album by Wilson Pickett
 "It's Too Late", a song by Bob Mould from Black Sheets of Rain
"It's Too Late", a song by The Troggs from Trogglodynamite
 "It's Too Late", a song by The Streets from Original Pirate Material
"It's Too Late", a song by The Kinks from The Kink Kontroversy

See also 
 Too Late (disambiguation)